The 15 departments and 2 autonomous regions of Nicaragua are divided into 153 municipalities. The formation and dissolution of municipalities is governed by the Law of Municipalities (in Spanish: Ley No.40 - Ley de Municipalidades), drafted and approved by the National Assembly on July 2. 1988.

The municipalities are responsible for planning and urban development, collection of municipal taxes, maintenance of public utilities and other services, such as parks, sewerage and public cemeteries. Whilst municipal governments may not be responsible for large highways, small roads and tracks usually come under their control. Additionally, municipal governments may issue permits for the operation of urban and intermunicipal bus services.

Other functions of municipal governments include the establishment of libraries, museums, municipal bands, zoos, the promotion of traditional and folklore festivals and various activities promoting education, culture, sports and tourism in the municipality.

List of municipalities 

Notes:

"Year" refers to the date the municipality was created. In some cases, the year refers to the date of the foundation of the municipality seat. This is particularly the case of colonial cities.

References 

 
Nicaragua 2
Nicaragua geography-related lists
Subdivisions of Nicaragua
 *
Nicaragua, municipalities